Imlay is an unincorporated community in Pennington County, in the U.S. state of South Dakota.

History
A post office called Imlay was in operation between 1908 and 1951. The community was named for Imlay Tabbets, a local cattleman.

References

Unincorporated communities in Pennington County, South Dakota
Unincorporated communities in South Dakota